7 is the second studio album from British rhythm and blues musical group Sault. The album has been met with positive critical reception.

Critical reception
In The Guardian, Alexis Petridis  reviewed both 5 and 7, giving them each five stars out of five, writing that  both are "fantastic, walking an idiosyncratic path that zig-zags between ESG-esque post-punk funk, early 80s boogie and something approaching neo-soul, without ever really fitting into any of those categories or sounding like straightforward homage". Reviewing the albums of the year for The Arts Desk, Barney Harsent gave 7 five out of five stars for writing compelling dance music but also deep soul music with "smooth intent and raw delivery" that are "as affecting combination as I’ve ever heard". In Q, Chris Catchpole scored this four out of five stars due to its mix of musical features and moods.

Citing their first two albums, Paste declared Sault one of the 15 new British bands that audiences should listen to in 2020.

Track listing
"Over" (Dean Josiah Cover and Cleopatra Nikolic)– 2:25
"No Bullshit" (Cover and Nikolic)– 3:47
"Feel So Good" (Cover and Nikolic)– 3:07
"Living in America" (Cover and Nikolic)– 3:21
"Tip Toe" (Cover and Nikolic)– 3:10
"Smile and Go" (Cover and Nikolic)– 2:44
"Threats" (Cover and Nikolic)– 4:21
"Red Lights" (Cover and Nikolic)– 3:04
"Friends" (Cover and Nikolic)– 3:58
"Waterfalls" (Cover and Nikolic)– 4:00

Personnel
Sault
Kadeem Clarke
Dean Josiah "Inflo" Cover
Cleopatra "Cleo Sol" Nikolic
Melisa "Kid Sister" Young

References

External links

Review aggregate by Album of the Year
Review from Album Reviews blog

2019 albums
Sault (band) albums
Self-released albums
Albums produced by Inflo